John Preston Martin (October 11, 1811 – December 23, 1862) was a political figure in Kentucky in the early 19th century. He was born on October 11, 1811, near Jonesville, Lee County, Virginia. He moved to Prestonsburg, Floyd County, Kentucky in 1828. He served in the State House of Representatives from 1841 through 1843.

Martin served in the 29th United States Congress from 1845 through 1847. He was not a candidate for renomination. He served in the Kentucky State Senate from 1855 through 1859, and was a delegate to the Democratic National Convention in 1856. He died in Prestonsburg on December 23, 1862. He is buried in May Cemetery.

Places named for John P. Martin
Martin County, Kentucky

External links

1811 births
1862 deaths
People from Jonesville, Virginia
People from Prestonburg, Kentucky
Democratic Party members of the Kentucky House of Representatives
Democratic Party Kentucky state senators
Democratic Party members of the United States House of Representatives from Kentucky
19th-century American politicians